Yousef Mazen Yousef Al-Naber (born 8 August 1989) is a Jordanian professional footballer who plays as a left winger for Jordanian club Al-Salt  and the Jordan national team.

Personal life
Yousef grew up in an Arab Christian family in Jordan with two sisters, Stephanie and Natasha, who play for both Shabab Al-Ordon and the Jordan women's national team.

Career statistics

International

References

External links 
 
 

1989 births
Living people
Association football midfielders
Jordanian footballers
Jordan international footballers
Footballers at the 2010 Asian Games
Asian Games competitors for Jordan
Al-Salt SC players
Jordanian Pro League players